Takhmina Ikromova (born 6 August 2004) is an Uzbekistani rhythmic gymnast. She is the 2022 Asian Championships All-around champion.

Career

Junior
She represented Uzbekistan at the 2019 Junior World Championships in Moscow, Russia and finished on 11th place in Team competition. Individually, she placed 10th in both Rope and Ribbon Qualifications.

Senior
At the 2021 Asian Rhythmic Gymnastics Championships held in Tashkent, Uzbekistan, she won the silver medal in All-around, Clubs and Ribbon and gold medal in Hoop final. At the 2021 World Championships in Kitakyushu, Japan she placed 29th in All-around Qualifications.

In 2022, she competed at World Cup Tashkent and won gold medal in All-around in front of Ekaterina Vedeneeva from Slovenia.  She also took gold medals in Hoop and Clubs final, bronze medal in Ribbon final and finished 4th place in Ball final.

Achievements 
 First Uzbek rhythmic gymnast to win a gold medal in an individual apparatus final at the FIG World Cup series.
 First Uzbek rhythmic gymnast to win a medal in an individual All-around at the FIG World Cup series.

References

Living people
2004 births
Uzbekistani rhythmic gymnasts
People from Samarkand
21st-century Uzbekistani women